Four Weddings and a Funeral is an American romantic comedy streaming television miniseries, based on the 1994 British film of the same name written by Richard Curtis. The miniseries, which premiered on July 31, 2019 on Hulu, was created by Mindy Kaling and Matt Warburton. It stars Nathalie Emmanuel, Nikesh Patel, Rebecca Rittenhouse, Brandon Mychal Smith, and John Reynolds.

Premise
Four Weddings and a Funeral follows "four American friends — Maya, Craig, Ainsley, and Duffy — who reunite for a fabulous London wedding. But after a bombshell at the altar throws their lives into turmoil, they must weather a tumultuous year of romance and heartbreak. Relationships are forged and broken, political scandals exposed, London social life lampooned, love affairs ignited and doused, and of course, there are four weddings...and a funeral."

Cast and characters

Main

 Nathalie Emmanuel as Maya Jones, a political speechwriter from the United States who recently moved to London to be closer to her best friends from college
 Nikesh Patel as Kashif (Kash) Khan, Ainsley's ex-fiancé and an unhappy investment banker who wants to become an actor
 Rebecca Rittenhouse as Ainsley Howard, an interior designer whose parents fund her interior design business and apartment
 John Reynolds as Caleb Duffy (Duffy), a Latin teacher who wants to become a novelist. He has been secretly in love with Maya for a decade.
 Brandon Mychal Smith as Craig Thompson, an investment banker who is also Kash's office mate and friend
 Zoe Boyle as Gemma Thorpe-Blood, Ainsley's British neighbor and friend who is a housewife
 Sophia La Porta as Zara, Craig's girlfriend, later wife
 Harish Patel as Haroon Khan, Kash's father who works at Heathrow Airport
 Guz Khan as Basheer, one of Kash's friends

Recurring
 Krrish Patel as Asif Khan, Kash's little brother
 Hector Bateman-Harden as Giles, Gemma and Quentin's son
 Nathan Stewart-Jarrett as Tony 2, Ainsley's assistant at her interior design business
 Rakhee Thakrar as Fatima, Kash's ex-girlfriend and Basheer's girlfriend
 Alex Jennings as Andrew Aldridge, a very conservative Member of Parliament, Maya's boss, and Tony 2's love interest. Jennings was originally cast as Charles in the 1994 film, before he was replaced by Hugh Grant due to production delays.
 Jamie Demetriou as Marcus, Maya's co-worker
 Dermot Mulroney as Bryce Dylan, Ainsley's recently divorced client and love interest

Guest
 Tom Mison as Quentin Thorpe-Blood, Gemma's wealthy husband
 Andie MacDowell as Mrs. Howard, Ainsley's mother. MacDowell played Carrie in the original 1994 film.
 Tommy Dewey as Ted Spencer, a New York-based senator who had an affair with Maya
 Ashley Madekwe as Julia, the mother of Craig's daughter Molly

Episodes

Production

Development
On November 1, 2017, it was announced that Hulu was developing an anthology television series adaptation of the film Four Weddings and a Funeral. Executive producers were set to include Mindy Kaling, Matt Warburton, Richard Curtis, Jonathan Prince, Tim Bevan, Eric Fellner, and Howard Klein. Production companies involved with the series were expected to consist of Working Title Films, 3 Arts Entertainment, MGM Television, and Universal Television. On May 2, 2018, it was announced that Hulu had given the production a series order.

On April 12, 2019, it was announced that the series would premiere on July 31, 2019.

Casting
On October 26, 2018, it was announced that Jessica Williams, Nikesh Patel, Rebecca Rittenhouse, and John Reynolds had been cast in starring roles. On November 21, 2018, it was reported that Williams' lead role of Jess had been reconceived into a new character named Maya and that Williams had been recast in the role by Nathalie Emmanuel. Additionally, it was further reported that Brandon Mychal Smith, Zoe Boyle, Harish Patel and Guz Khan had joined the cast and that Andie MacDowell would make a guest appearance in a nod to her starring role in the 1994 film, albeit not as her original character Carrie from the film. On December 7, 2018, it was announced that Tom Mison and Ashley Madekwe had been cast in recurring roles and that Tommy Dewey would make a guest appearance. In February 2019, Sophia La Porta joined the cast.

Filming
Principal photography for the series commenced on November 26, 2018, in London, England.

Music
The Four Weddings and a Funeral (Music From the Original TV Series) soundtrack was released on August 14, 2019 which consisted of a blend of cover versions and originals.

Reception
On review aggregator Rotten Tomatoes, the series holds an approval rating of 42% based on 38 reviews, with an average rating of 5.59/10. The website's critical consensus reads, "Despite an impressive cast and crew, Four Weddings and a Funeral falls flat, relying too heavily on genre clichés to offer audiences anything more than just another mediocre romcom." On Metacritic, it has a weighted average score of 50 out of 100, based on 20 critics, indicating "mixed or average reviews".

References

External links
 

2010s American comedy television miniseries
2010s American LGBT-related comedy television series
2019 American television series debuts
2019 American television series endings
English-language television shows
Gay-related television shows
Hulu original programming
Live action television shows based on films
Television episodes written by Bisha K. Ali
Television series by 3 Arts Entertainment
Television series by MGM Television
Television series by Universal Television
Television series created by Mindy Kaling